Bar Aftab-e Zafari (also Romanized as Bar Āftāb-e Z̧afarī) is a village in Donbaleh Rud-e Jonubi Rural District, Dehdez District, Izeh County, Khuzestan Province, Iran. At the 2006 census, its population was 180, in 29 families.

References 

Populated places in Izeh County